NOAA Weather Radio NWR; also  known as NOAA Weather Radio All Hazards is an automated 24-hour network of VHF FM weather radio stations in the United States (U.S.) that broadcast weather information directly from a nearby National Weather Service office. The routine programming cycle includes local or regional weather forecasts, synopsis, climate summaries or zone/lake/coastal waters forecasts (when applicable). During severe conditions the cycle is shortened into: hazardous weather outlooks, short-term forecasts, special weather statements or tropical weather summaries (the first two aren't normally broadcast in most offices). It occasionally broadcasts other non-weather related events such as national security statements, natural disaster information, environmental and public safety statements (such as an AMBER Alert), civil emergencies, fires, evacuation orders, and other hazards sourced from the Federal Communications Commission's (FCC) Emergency Alert System. NOAA Weather Radio uses automated broadcast technology (since 2016: Broadcast Message Handler) that allows (and frees NWS staff as well) for the recycling of segments featured in one broadcast cycle seamlessly into another and more regular updating of segments to each of the transmitters. It also speeds up the warning transmitting process.

Weather radios are widely sold online and in retail stores that specialize in consumer electronics in Canada and the U.S. Additionally, they are readily available in many supermarkets and drugstores in the southern and midwestern US, which are particularly susceptible to severe weather—large portions of these regions are commonly referred to as "Tornado Alley".

History 
The U.S. Weather Bureau first began broadcasting marine weather information in Chicago and New York City on two VHF radio stations in 1960 as an experiment. Proving to be successful, the broadcasts expanded to serve the general public in coastal regions in the 1960s and early 1970s. By early 1970, ESSA listed 20 U.S. cities using 162.55 MHz and one using 163.275 "ESSA VHF Radio Weather." Later, the U.S. Weather Bureau adopted its current name, National Weather Service (NWS), and was operating 29 VHF-FM weather-radio transmitters under the National Oceanic and Atmospheric Administration (NOAA) which replaced ESSA in 1970. The service was designed with boaters, fishermen, travelers and more in mind, allowing listeners to quickly receive a "life-saving" weather bulletin from their local weather forecast office (WFO), along with routinely updated forecasts and other climatological data in a condensed format at any time of the day or night. The general public could have the latest weather updates when they needed them, and the benefit of more lead-time to prepare during severe conditions. In 1974, NOAA Weather Radio (NWR), as it was now called, reached about 44 percent of the U.S. population over 66 nationwide transmitters. NWR grew to over 300 stations by the late 1970s.

Local NWS staff were the voices heard on NWR stations from its inception until the late 1990s when "Paul" was introduced. The messages were recorded on tape, and later by digital means, then placed in the broadcast cycle. This technology limited the programming variability and locked it into a repetitive sequential order. It also slowed down the speed of warning messages when severe weather happened, because each NWS office could have up to eight transmitters. "Paul" was a computerized voice using the DECtalk text-to-speech system. "Paul's" voice was dissatisfactory and difficult to understand; thus "Craig", "Tom," "Donna" and later "Javier" were introduced in 2002 using the Speechify text-to-speech system from SpeechWorks (not to be confused with the iOS app of the same name). A completely new voice from the VoiceText text-to-speech system, also named “Paul”, was introduced in 2016 and implemented nationwide by late in the year. Live human voices are still used occasionally for weekly tests of the Specific Area Message Encoding (SAME) and 1,050 Hz tone alerting systems, station IDs, and in the event of system failure or computer upgrades. They will also be used on some stations for updates on the time and radio frequency.

In the 1990s, the National Weather Service adopted plans to implement SAME technology nationwide; the roll-out moved slowly until 1995, when the U.S. government provided the budget needed to develop the SAME technology across the entire radio network. Nationwide implementation occurred in 1997 when the Federal Communications Commission (FCC) adopted the SAME standard as part of its new Emergency Alert System (EAS). NOAA Weather Radio's public alerting responsibilities expanded from hazardous weather-only events to "all hazards" being broadcast.

Expansion 
In the wake of the 1965 Palm Sunday tornado outbreak, one of the key recommendations from the U.S. Weather Bureau's storm survey team, was the establishment of a nationwide radio network that could be used to broadcast weather warnings to the general public, hospitals, key institutions, news media, schools, and the public safety community. Starting in 1966, the Environmental Science Services Administration (ESSA) started a nationwide program known as "ESSA VHF Weather Radio Network." In the early 1970s, this was changed to NOAA Weather Radio. The service was expanded to coastal locations during the 1970s in the wake of Hurricane Camille based upon recommendations made by the Department of Commerce after the storm in September 1969.

Since then, a proliferation of stations have been installed and activated to ensure near-complete geographical coverage and "weather-readiness", many of which have been funded by state emergency management agencies in cooperation with the NOAA to expand the network, or state public broadcasting networks. To avoid interference and allow for more specific area coverage, the number of frequencies in use by multiple stations grew to two with the addition of 162.400 MHz in 1970 followed by the third (162.475) in 1975 with the remaining four (162.425, 162.450, 162.500 & 162.525) coming into use by 1981.

In the 1950s, the Weather Bureau started with KWO35 in New York City and later added KWO39 in Chicago. By 1965 it had added KID77 in Kansas City, home to the Severe Local Storms Center, as the third continuous VHF radio transmitter with the fourth, KBA99 in Honolulu, operating by January 1967.

Denver became the 60th NWR station in September 1972 and by December 1976 there were roughly 100 stations transmitting on three channels in December 1976.
Growth accelerated in the mid-1970s with NWR reaching 200 radio stations in May 1978 with WXK49 in Memphis, Tennessee; 300 in September 1979 with WXL45 in Columbia, Missouri; and by 1988, the NWS operated about 380 stations covering approximately 90 percent of the nation's population. This grew to over 500 radio stations by May 1999, and over 800 by the end of 2001. As of January 2020, there were about 1,032 stations in operation in fifty states, Puerto Rico, the U.S. Virgin Islands, American Samoa, Guam, and Saipan, with over 95% effective coverage.

Operations
The NOAA Weather Radio network is provided as a public service by the National Oceanic and Atmospheric Administration. NOAA also provides secondary weather information, usually limited to marine storm warnings for sea vessels navigating the Atlantic and Pacific Oceans, to HF band "time stations" WWV and WWVH. These shortwave radio stations continuously broadcast time signals and disseminate the "official" U.S. Government time, and are operated by the Department of Commerce's National Institute of Standards and Technology.

Radio 
The radio service transmits weather and marine forecasts (where applicable) and other related information, without any interruptions. In addition, NWR works in cooperation with the FCC's Emergency Alert System (EAS), providing comprehensive severe weather alerts and civil emergency information. In conjunction with federal, state and local emergency managers and other public officials, NWR has the ability to broadcast alerts and post-event information for all types of hazards, including natural (such as earthquakes or avalanches), human-made (such as chemical releases or oil spills), technological (such as nuclear power plant emergencies) and other public safety (such as "AMBER alerts" or 9-1-1 telephone outages). Listening to a NOAA Weather Radio station requires a VHF radio receiver or scanner capable of receiving at least one of seven specific VHF-FM channels within the frequency range of 162.400 through 162.550 MHz, collectively known as the "Weather Band". For example, a receiver that only tunes in standard AM or FM broadcast stations will not suffice.

Television 

Many cable television systems and some commercial television stations will, during EAS activation, rebroadcast the audio of a warning message first heard on their local NWR station, to alert viewers of a severe weather event or civil emergency, usually with the issuance of a tornado warning or tornado emergency, especially in tornado-prone areas of the country.

Programming

Broadcast schedule
Local NOAA offices update the content broadcast over NOAA Weather Radio transmitters on a regular basis, according to the following schedule:

Updates to routine observational products are typically recorded once per hour, and are broadcast at five or 10, and at 15 minutes past the hour.

Broadcast routine

As a continuous spoken weather service, NOAA Weather Radio All Hazards maintains a multi-tier concept for relaying meteorological observations, routine forecasts and weather hazards to the general public. Actual forecasts and offered products vary by the area serviced by the transmitter. During severe weather situations, Watch Information Statements for government-designated jurisdictions served by the local NWR station are typically inserted within the station's normal playlist of routine products; a special severe weather playlist temporarily suspends most regularly scheduled routine products in the event National Weather Service-issued warnings (mainly severe thunderstorm, tornado or flash flood warnings) are in effect for the station's broadcast area, which solely incorporate watch, warning and Special Weather Statements, and any active Short-Term Forecasts and Hazardous Weather Outlooks.

These are additional products that are included in the broadcast cycle occasionally (but are broadcast at randomized times, depending on the individual transmitter[s]):
 Air Quality Index Statement
 Agricultural Forecast
 Area Forecast Discussion
 Area Weather Update
 Daily/Monthly Hydrometeorological Products
 Heat Index Forecast
 High Seas Forecast
 Hydro-Met Data Report
 Miscellaneous Hydrologic Data
 Miscellaneous Local Product
 Miscellaneous River Product
 Public Information Statement
 Offshore Forecast
 Quantitative Precipitation Forecast
 State Forecast
 Suppression Forecast
 Tabular State Forecast
 Terminal Aerodrome Forecast
 Travellers Forecast

Weather radio receivers 

There are a variety of different types of weather radio receivers available in the U.S., including:
 Professional-grade receivers, typically rack-mounted, for use by broadcast radio and television stations and public agencies who are responsible for acting on or retransmitting weather and emergency alert broadcasts.
 Base-station consumer radios powered by commercial AC power (often with a battery backup).
 Hand-held battery powered radios, suitable for use by hikers, boaters, and in emergency preparedness kits.
 Hand-crank portable radios that do not require AC or battery power, especially designed for use in emergency preparedness kits.
 Weather radio receivers integrated as an auxiliary function into other devices, such as GMRS radios, portable televisions, FM radios, etc.
 Radio receiver modules, such as the Si4707 from Silicon Labs, designed for electronics experimenters and project builders have in the past been available.
Historically, it was not uncommon to sell portable radios that featured AM, FM, and TV audio (VHF channels 2–13), with the weather band included some distance down the dial from TV channel 7 (after the U.S. digital TV conversion, the television sound function of these radios became obsolete).

One of the early consumer weather alert radios (model KH6TY) was designed and manufactured by Howard (Skip) Teller, who was issued a patent on the alerting mechanism and was instrumental in the design of the PSK31 Digipan software and hardware, and the Amateur radio NBEMS emergency communications system.

Since April 2004, radio models marketed as "Public Alert-certified" must include these features and meet certain performance criteria, as specified in electronics industry standard CEA-2009.

The price of a consumer-grade weather radio varies depending on the model and its extra features.

Radio frequencies used

The United States' NWS, Canada's Weatheradio, Mexico's SARMEX and Bermuda operate their government weather radio stations on the same marine VHF radio band, using FM transmitters, and the same seven frequencies (162.400 – 162.550 MHz) as NOAA Weather Radio (NWR). Bermuda only uses 162.550 (land) and 162.400 (marine).

NWR transmitters operate VHF-FM between 5–1,000 watts. NWR channels operating in the range of 162.3625–162.5875 MHz (162.4–.55 ± 37.5 kHz) have a band spacing of 25 kHz may have bandwidths up to 16 kHz. The original "weather" frequency used by multiple stations was 162.550 MHz, followed by 162.400 in 1970, 162.475 in 1975, and the last four (162.425, 162.450, 162.500 & 162.525 MHz) in 1981.

163.275 MHz was used by KHB47 in New London, Connecticut initially in 1969 until switching to 162.400 in 1970 to avoid overlapping with KWO35 in New York, and internally by NWS in case of power outage, but is no longer in active use. 169.075 MHz was initially used by WWG75 transmitting from Mt. Haleakala on Maui in 1970 before also switching to 162.400 by 1972.

Channel designations
NOAA Weather Radio, Weatheradio Canada and SARMEX all refer to the seven stations by their frequencies (MHz):

Other channel designations such as WX1 through WX7 "have no special significance but are often designated this way in consumer equipment" and "other channel numbering schemes are also prevalent/possible" according to NOAA and USCG. Ordering channels by when they were established (WX1, WX2, ...) is "becoming less 'popular' over time than a numerical ordering of channels." Weather radios may list stations in the order of their WX#, or by a "Preset Channel" number 1 thru 7 in ascending frequency order.

The "WX#" format is continued from WX8 up to WX12 on some lists and radios to include 163.275 MHz and or one or more of the Canadian continuous marine broadcast (CMB) frequencies 161.650, 161.775, 161.750, 162.000. Unlike WX1-WX7 typically ordered by frequency adoption by NWS, there is no consistent frequency inclusion nor assignment for WX8-WX12. Effective January 1, 2019, channels 2027 (161.950 MHz, 27B) and 2028 (162.000 MHz, 28B) are designated as ASM 1 and ASM 2 respectively for application specific messages (ASM) as described in Recommendation ITU-R M.2092.

The "WX" arose from the Morse code prosign shorthand for weather reports (WX) combined with the order number that the seven frequencies were adopted for use nationally. More frequencies helped prevent interference from other nearby transmitters, growing in use in the 1990s in less populated rural, areas and as fill-in broadcast translators relaying an existing station or sending a separate, more localized broadcast into remote or mountainous areas, or those areas with reception trouble.

As with conventional broadcast television and radio signals, it may be possible to receive more than one of the seven weather channels at a given location, dependent on factors such as the location, transmitter power, range and designated coverage area of each station. The NWS suggests that users determine which frequency (as opposed to channel) is intended for their specific location so that they are assured of receiving correct and timely information.

Present day

All seven NWR channels are available on stand-alone weather radio receivers that are currently sold online and in retail stores (available for prices ranging from US$20 and up), as well as on most marine VHF radio transceivers, amateur radios and digital scanners. In addition, more mainstream consumer electronics, such as clock radios, portable multi-band receivers and two-way radios (such as FRS, GMRS and CB radio), now feature the ability to also receive NWR channels. Many of the aforementioned devices also incorporate automatic alerting capabilities. Many American television stations offer discounted pricing for radios to viewers as a public courtesy (especially in highly tornado-prone areas), where they are often marketed as an essential safety device on par with a smoke alarm for home fires.

Coverage
According to NOAA, reliable signal reception typically extends in about 80 to 100-mile radius from a full-power (1,000 W) transmitter, assuming level terrain. However, signal blockages can occur, especially in mountainous areas. As of 2016, there are over a thousand NWR transmitters across the U.S., covering 95% of the population. Because each transmitter can cover several counties, typically a person will program their weather radio to receive only the alerts for their county or nearby surrounding counties where weather systems are most likely to move in from.

Alerting

Whenever a weather or civil emergency alert is issued for any part of a NWR station's coverage area, many radios with an alert feature will sound an alarm or turn on upon detection of a  that sounds just before the voice portion of an alert message. The specification calls for the NWS transmitter to sound the alert tone for ten seconds and for the receiver to react to it within five seconds. This system simply triggers the alarm or turns on the radio of every muted receiver within reception range of that NWR station (in other words, any receiver located anywhere within the transmitter's broadcast area). Generally, receivers with this functionality are either older or basic models.

Many newer or more sophisticated alerting receivers can detect, decode and react to a digital signal called Specific Area Message Encoding (SAME), which allows users to program their radios to receive alerts only for specific geographical areas of interest and concern, rather than for an entire broadcast area. These advanced models may also have colored LED status lights which indicate the level of the alert as an "advisory"/"statement", "watch" or "warning" (either amber or green for advisories and statements, orange or yellow for watches, red for warnings).

This encoding/decoding technology has the advantage of avoiding "false alarms" triggered by the 1,050 Hz tone itself in locations outside the intended warning area. Broadcast areas are generally divided into SAME locations by county or marine zone using the standard U.S. Government FIPS county codes.

NOAA's SAME alert protocol was later adopted and put into use by the Emergency Alert System (EAS) in 1997 – the replacement for the earlier Emergency Broadcast System (EBS) and even earlier CONELRAD – now required by the FCC for standard broadcast TV and radio stations. Environment Canada eventually integrated SAME alerting capability into its Weatheradio Canada network in 2004. Organizations are able to disseminate and coordinate emergency alerts and warning messages through NOAA Weather Radio and other public systems by means of the Integrated Public Alert and Warning System.

In September 2008, Walgreens announced that it would utilize SAME technology to deliver local weather alerts via a system of LED billboards located outside its drugstore locations to provide an additional avenue of weather information. Many national billboard companies (such as Outfront Media, Clear Channel Outdoor and Lamar, among others) also use their color LED billboard networks to display weather warnings to drivers, while state-owned freeway notification boards, which utilize the EAS/NOAA infrastructure for AMBER Alerts, also display weather warnings.

Emergency alert test procedure

Every local National Weather Service weather forecast office is required to conduct a scheduled weekly test of the NOAA Weather Radio public alert system, generally occurring every Wednesday between 10:00 a.m. and 12:00 p.m. (noon). Certain Weather Forecast Offices conduct this twice a week, usually testing two time on Wednesday, usually between 10:00 a.m. and 12:00 p.m. (noon) and then again between 6:00 p.m. and 8:00 p.m. Other offices test once on Wednesday, and then again on Saturday. Some NOAA Weather Radio stations also broadcast tests of the Emergency Alert System on predetermined days and times.

If there is a threat of severe weather that day in a NWR station's listening area, the weekly test is postponed until the next available fair-weather day (sometimes, a short message stating the reason for the test's cancellation is broadcast). The required weekly test (SAME event code "RWT") interrupts regular NWR programming — during the test, a SAME data header is sent, followed by a 1050 Hz attention tone, the voice test message, then a SAME end-of-message (EOM) signal. The text of the test message used by most NWS offices, with variations depending on the office, is typically as follows:

Voices
From the introduction of NOAA Weather Radio until the late 1990s, nearly all the voices heard in the broadcasts were those of the staff at local National Weather Service (NWS) offices. The messages were manually recorded, first on tape cartridges and later digitally, and then placed in the broadcast cycle. As the NWS added more transmitters to provide broader radio coverage, the staff had difficulty keeping broadcast cycles updated in a timely fashion, especially during major severe weather outbreaks.

System upgrades

1990s Console Replacement System 
To manage the increasing number of transmitters for each office and to speed the overall delivery of warning messages to the public, the Console Replacement System (CRS) was deployed at NWS weather forecast offices in 1997. CRS introduced a computerized voice nicknamed "Paul", using a text-to-speech system which was based on the DECtalk technology. This system was chosen over more readily available concatenative synthesis because each forecast, watch and warning requires unique wording to relay the most accurate and relevant information. Concatenation is typically used by telephone companies, banks and other service businesses where a limited vocabulary of recorded words can easily take the place of specific, repetitive phrases and sentences. NOAA Weather Radio broadcasts contain a wide variety of information which changes with the weather. Forecasters need to have many words to choose from when writing their forecasts and warnings for the public. Although CRS greatly enhanced the delivery speed and scheduling of Weather Radio messages, some listeners disliked Paul's voice, as it was very monotone and did not resemble a normal speaking voice due to CRS not having the technological advances at the time to resemble human speech patterns.

2002 Voice Improvement Program 
In 2002, the National Weather Service contracted with Siemens Information and Communication and SpeechWorks to introduce improved, more natural voices. The Voice Improvement Plan (VIP) was implemented, involving a separate computer processor linked into CRS that fed digitized sound files to the broadcast suite. The improvements involved one male voice ("Craig"), and one female voice ("Donna"). Additional upgrades in 2003 improved "Donna" and introduced an improved male voice nicknamed "Tom", which had variable intonation based on the urgency of the report. As part of this upgrade a Spanish voice, "Javier", was added at a few sites.  Due to the superior quality of the "Tom" voice, most NWS offices used it for the majority of broadcasts and announcements.

Broadcast Message Handler
In 2016, the NWS replaced almost all of the CRS systems in operation at its Weather Forecast Offices—which had been in use for over 20 years and were approaching the end of the system's expected service life—with the Broadcast Message Handler (BMH). The new system is more closely integrated with the AWIPS software and intended to be more reliable. The BMH units replaced "Donna" and "Tom" with an improved "Paul" voice (its classification from new voice partner NeoSpeech). Many stations have dubbed him "Paul II" or "Paul Jr" to avoid confusion with CRS "Perfect Paul". For the NWS offices that incorporate Spanish programming into the NWR broadcast cycle, VIP "Javier" was replaced with a much improved female voice named "Violetta" (another voice from NeoSpeech). The upgrade initially began at six offices: Greenville-Spartanburg, South Carolina; Brownsville, Texas; Omaha, Nebraska; Portland, Oregon; Anchorage, Alaska; and Tiyan, Guam. Many of the stations saw an initial negative reaction primarily due to many mispronunciations. Most local NWS Offices provide a method of reporting these problems, and have the ability to reprogram the voices accordingly.

Human voices 
Human voices are still heard on occasion, but sparingly, mainly during station identifications, public forecasts, National Marine Fisheries Service messages, public information statements, public service announcements, required weekly tests, and severe weather events. The capability exists for a meteorologist to broadcast live on any transmitter if computer problems occur or added emphasis is desired, or to notify listeners who are concerned about a silent station on another frequency whether that station is dark due to technical errors, prolonged power outage, or a weather event has forced it off the air.

Broadcasting-in-Spanish 
Some weather forecast offices will issue a secondary report in Spanish during severe weather events or warnings. Few NWR stations broadcast weather information in Spanish.

Four WFOs disseminate all content using dedicated stations to be only Broadcast in the Spanish-Language, separate from their English-language Counter Channels: San Diego (WNG712 in Coachella/Riverside), El Paso (WNG652), Miami (WZ2531 in Hialeah, since 2012), and Brownsville (WZ2541 in Pharr and WZ2542 in Harlingen, since 2014). These stations originally used a synthesized Spanish male voice named "Javier" for all broadcasts, but have since been upgraded with the BMH female voice "Violetta".

The Albuquerque WFO often repeats weather alerts in Spanish after their initial dissemination in English. Station WXJ69 in San Juan, Puerto Rico broadcasts all information, including forecasts, in the same manner.

The National Weather Service in Tampa Bay Area/Ruskin plays a severe weather programming Station I.D. in the broadcast cycle if an alert is issued for the station warning area using the Spanish Voice, but it plays the English text version of the product, resulting in the Text-To-Speech software reading English text being pronounced in Spanish.

Live streaming
Several websites provide internet audio streaming of a subset of the NOAA Weather radio stations. The most prominent of these, the Wunderadio section of weather information website Weather Underground, discontinued live streams of NWR broadcasts in April 2017.
As the Wunderadio internet streaming service dissolved, Many sources such as noaaweatherradio.org, broadcastify.com, weatherusa.net/radio and PlanoWeather developed, allowing previous users of the service to continue monitoring livestreams from Wunderadio, as well as newer broadcasts from different locations.

See also

 NAVTEX
 Severe weather terminology (United States)
 Weather radio
 Weatheradio Canada

References

External links
 NWS Organization (shows all NOAA offices)
 U.S. NOAA/NWS Weatheradio page
 NWR Receiver Consumer Information
 NOAA county-by-county coverage
 ESSA News September 11, 1970

NOAA Weather Radio brochure evolution

 "ESSA VHF Weather Radio Stations" Weatherwise magazine, August 1969
 Marine Weather Services: ESSA VHF Radio Weather, ESSA/PI 680033  1969
 Marine Weather Services: ESSA VHF Radio Weather, ESSA/PI 680033  1970
 NOAA VHF Radio Weather, NOAA/PI 70035, 1970
 NOAA VHF Radio Weather, NOAA/PA 70035, Rev. 1972
 Marine Weather Services: NOAA VHF Radio Weather, NOAA/PA 70029, Rev. 1972
 Marine Weather Services: NOAA VHF Radio Weather, NOAA/PA 70029, Rev. 1974
 NOAA Weather Radio NOAA/PA 74035, 1975
 Marine Weather Services: NOAA Weather Radio, NOAA/PA 74034, Rev. 1976
 NOAA Weather Radio, NOAA/PA 76015, 1976
 NOAA Weather Radio, NOAA/PA 76015, Rev. July 1988
 NOAA Weather Radio, NOAA/PA 96070 (station list), May 1999
 NOAA Weather Radio, NOAA/PA 200356 (maps), October 2002
 All Hazards NOAA Weather Radio (NWR), NOAA/PA 96070 (no list), October 2007
 NOAA Weather Radio All Hazards (NWR), NOAA/PA 200352 Poster, April 2014
 All Hazards NOAA Weather Radio, NOAA/PA 94062, Rev. January 2020 

 
1950s establishments in the United States
Disaster preparedness in the United States
Emergency Alert System
Weather radio
National Weather Service
Bandplans
Types of radios
Weather warnings and advisories